Isaac Wigans (Antwerp, 1615 – Antwerp, c. 1663) was a Flemish still life painter active in Antwerp.  He is known for his fruit still lifes and banquet-style still lifes.  He may also have been active as a copyist or imitator of monochrome banquet still lifes in the style of contemporary Dutch artists in The Hague.

Life
Little is known about the life of the artist.  He was born in Antwerp where he was baptized on 11 June 1615.  He trained with the Flemish history painter Vincent Malo.  He was registered in the guild year 1631-1632 at the Antwerp Guild of Saint Luke as a pupil of Malo.  He was probably not identical with the Isac Wigans who was registered at the Antwerp Guild as a master in 1651 as the son of an existing member.  It is likely that this was a younger member from his family.

The artist was active in Antwerp until his death in the year 1662 or 1663.

Work

Only three signed works by the artist are known. Isaac Wigans was a still life specialist who is known for his fruit still lifes and banquet style-still lifes.  He is also believed to have painted monochrome banquet still lifes in the style of contemporary Dutch artists active in The Hague such as Pieter Claesz and Willem Claesz Heda. There is no unanimity among art historians on the attribution of certain works to the artist.

References

External links

1615 births
1663 deaths
Flemish Baroque painters
Flemish still life painters
Artists from Antwerp
Painters from Antwerp